Plantations Convention, 1958 is  an International Labour Organization Convention.

It was established in 1958, with the preamble stating:
Having considered the question of conditions of employment of plantation workers,...

Ratifications
As of 2022, the convention has been ratified by 12 states. Two of the ratifying states—Brazil and Liberia—have subsequently denounced the treaty.

External links 
Text.
Ratifications.

International Labour Organization conventions
Treaties concluded in 1958
Treaties entered into force in 1960
Treaties of Cuba
Treaties of Ivory Coast
Treaties of Ecuador
Treaties of Guatemala
Treaties of Mexico
Treaties of Nicaragua
Treaties of Panama
Treaties of the Philippines
Treaties of Sri Lanka
Treaties of Uruguay
Plantations
1958 in labor relations